Sherwite Hafez (born 3 February 1967) is an Egyptian swimmer. She competed in two events at the 1984 Summer Olympics.

References

External links
 

1967 births
Living people
Egyptian female swimmers
Olympic swimmers of Egypt
Swimmers at the 1984 Summer Olympics
Place of birth missing (living people)
20th-century Egyptian women
21st-century Egyptian women
African Games medalists in swimming
Competitors at the 1987 All-Africa Games
African Games gold medalists for Egypt
African Games silver medalists for Egypt
African Games bronze medalists for Egypt